" I Always Feel Like" is the lead single released from TRU's fourth studio album, Tru 2 da Game.

Background
The song incorporated the melody and contained re-sung elements of Rockwell's 1984 hit, "Somebody's Watching Me", with Mo B. Dick singing the hook from the original song. Mo B. Dick also produced the song, along with fellow Beats By the Pound members KLC and Craig B. Master P, Silkk the Shocker and Mia X performed the song.
 
Released less than a month before Tru 2 da Game, "I Always Feel Like" became the group's most successful single, reaching number 71 on the Billboard Hot 100. It was also a sizable rap hit, peaking at number 11 on the Billboard Hot Rap Singles.

Single track listing
"I Always Feel Like" (Radio Version) - 4:15
"I Always Feel Like" (Street Version) - 5:40
"Pimp Shit" - 4:25
"Eyes of a Killa" - 4:11
"I Always Feel Like" (Album Version) - 5:10
"I Always Feel Like" (Instrumental) - 5:31

Charts

Peak positions

Year-end charts

References

1997 singles
TRU (band) songs